The Scottish Centre for Enabling Technologies is a collaborative initiative between the University of the West of Scotland, and The Digital Design Studio in Glasgow School of Art.

The Centre is a SEEKIT project co-funded by the two partner universities, the Scottish Government and Scottish Enterprise, and as such it is tasked with working with Scottish companies to assist them in exploiting the latest technologies. The Centre offers a range of free services such as technology advice and guidance, as well as a £5000 feasibility study grant.

Feasibility Study 

The feasibility study grant is designed to help innovative SMEs overcome any technological barriers they might face by leveraging the expertise within the 2 partner universities. It allows companies to offset the risk of experimenting with new ideas while also helping them tap into the university knowledge base. Some companies have also used this to assess existing products/services from a usability/performance perspective. Eligible projects would be those leveraging technology to enhance their services, products, knowledge or business processes.

Initially targeted at the creative industries sector the grant provides up to ￡5000 of match funded support. The SME's contribution can be financial or "in kind" and thus can include resource and equipment costs. The grant is paid to the research institution involved on satisfactory completion of the study.
Outputs from feasibility studies typically consist of a feasibility report, proof of concept, technology demonstrator or a combination of both.

External links 
 SCET official website
 University of the West of Scotland Website
 Glasgow School of Art Website

Innovation organizations
Science and technology in Scotland
Glasgow School of Art
University of the West of Scotland
Research and development in the United Kingdom